The 116th Pennsylvania House of Representatives District is located in Luzerne County and Schuylkill County and includes the following areas:

Luzerne County

 Hazleton
 Hazle Township
West Hazleton

Schuylkill County

East Union Township
Kline Township
Mahanoy City
Mahanoy Township
McAdoo
North Union Township
Ringtown
Shenandoah
Union Township

Representatives

References

Government of Luzerne County, Pennsylvania
116